Kandal (also Romanized as Kandāl; also known as Ja”farābād and Kandil) is a village in Qarah Quyun-e Shomali Rural District, in the Central District of Showt County, West Azerbaijan Province, Iran. At the 2006 census, its population was 441, in 102 families.

References 

Populated places in Showt County